The C. E. Lipe Machine Shop was established in Syracuse, New York in 1880 in the Lynch Building by Charles E. Lipe (1850–1895), a mechanical engineer. The building became an early industrial incubator and was commonly known as the Lipe Shop. While Lipe worked on his own ideas, he rented out facilities to others. Some of the leaders in industry worked both independently and side by side in this building to solve the industrial problems of their era. "These men sowed the germs that sprouted into major business enterprises in Syracuse and elsewhere" and for many years the machine shop was known as the "cradle of Syracuse industries."

The building is still in use today as a hardware store.

External links 
 Industrial Age Fed Syracuse Boom, Tim Knauss, Syracuse Then and Now, 2010
 Central Upstate's History of Innovation & Creativity - New York's Creative Core, 2010
 Rollway Bearing History, 2011
 Lipe Machine Shop - Wikimapia, 2011
 Who's Who of Victorian Cinema - Henry Norton ('Harry') Marvin, 2011

References 

Defunct companies based in Syracuse, New York